Gwynedd is a principal area of Wales.

Gwynedd may also refer to:
Kingdom of Gwynedd, the ancient Kingdom and nucleus of Upper Gwynedd
Perfeddwlad, also known as Lower Gwynedd, or "middle country", as in between Gwynedd and England, and Gwynedd and Powys
Gwynedd in the High Middle Ages
Culture of Gwynedd during the High Middle Ages
Upper Gwynedd Township, Montgomery County, Pennsylvania, U.S.
Lower Gwynedd Township, Montgomery County, Pennsylvania
Gwynedd, Pennsylvania
Gwynedd Valley, Pennsylvania
Gwynedd-Mercy College
Gwynedd (fictional), fictional Kingdom of Gwynedd in the Deryni series of novels

See also
Gwyneth